Parnell Motley (born October 28, 1997) is an American football cornerback who is a free agent. He played college football at Oklahoma and signed with the Tampa Bay Buccaneers as an undrafted free agent in 2020. Motley has also been a member of the San Francisco 49ers, Denver Broncos, Detroit Lions and Cleveland Browns.

Professional career

Tampa Bay Buccaneers
Motley signed with the Tampa Bay Buccaneers as an undrafted free agent on May 4, 2020, and made the team's 53-man roster after training camp. He played in two games before being waived on October 12, 2020.

San Francisco 49ers
On October 13, 2020, Motley was claimed off waivers by the San Francisco 49ers. Motley was waived by the 49ers on October 26, 2020, and re-signed to the practice squad two days later.

Denver Broncos
On December 16, 2020, Motley was signed by the Denver Broncos off the 49ers practice squad. He was waived on August 31, 2021.

Detroit Lions
On September 2, 2021, Motley was signed to the Detroit Lions practice squad. He signed a reserve/future contract with the Lions on January 10, 2022. He was waived on May 10, 2022.

Cleveland Browns
On May 18, 2022, Motley signed with the Cleveland Browns. He was waived on August 22, 2022.

Calgary Stampeders 
On September 29, 2022, Motley signed with the Calgary Stampeders of the Canadian Football League (CFL).

DC Defenders 
On November 17, 2022, Motley was drafted by the DC Defenders of the XFL.

References

External links
Denver Broncos bio
Tampa Bay Buccaneers bio
Oklahoma Sooners bio

1997 births
Living people
Players of American football from Washington, D.C.
American football cornerbacks
Oklahoma Sooners football players
Tampa Bay Buccaneers players
San Francisco 49ers players
Denver Broncos players
Detroit Lions players
Cleveland Browns players
Calgary Stampeders players
DC Defenders players